Jatiya Gana Front (National People's Front) is a leftist political group in Bangladesh. JGF split from Workers Party of Bangladesh in 1995. JGF is led by Tipu Biswas.

In November 2007, JGF joined 10 other leftist political parties in forming the platform Gonotantrik Bam Morcha. The platform presented 15 demands, including that Fakhruddin Ahmed's caretaker government lift the state of emergency and allow political activities nationwide. In May 2010, JGF again joined most other leftist political parties to put forward a unified list of 11 demands in the areas of economics, justice, corruption, and abuse of power.

References

 
1995 establishments in Bangladesh
Political parties established in 1995
Political parties in Bangladesh
Socialist parties in Bangladesh